Brogan or O'Brogan, is a surname originating in Ireland, anglicized from the original Ó Brógáin. The form McBrogan, is also present sharing the meaning of O'Brogan, essentially "son of Brogan."  The name can be traced back to ancient King Breogán, and Saint Brogan (Broccán Clóen), Saint Patrick's nephew and scribe, and has many original meanings, including sorrowful, sharp-faced, sturdy and strong.

Traditionally, Brogan has also been used as a first name for boys, after the Saint.

Notable people with the name
Alan Brogan, an Irish footballer
Benedict Brogan, English journalist
Bernard Brogan (senior), an Irish footballer
Bernard Brogan (junior), an Irish footballer
Bill Brogan, Australian rugby league footballer
Colm Brogan, a Scottish journalist and political pamphleteer
Denis William Brogan (1900–1974), Scottish historian
Frank Brogan, an American politician
Hugh Brogan (1936–2019), British historian
Jack Brogan (1930–2022), American art fabricator
James Brogan (footballer born 1865), a Scottish footballer
James Brogan (footballer born 1890), a Scottish footballer
Jim Brogan (basketball), an American basketball player
Jim Brogan (Scottish footballer), a Scottish footballer
Jim Brogan (Gaelic footballer), an Irish Gaelic footballer
John Brogan (footballer born 1958), a Scottish footballer
Joseph Brogan, American politician, Missouri senator
Mervyn Brogan, an Australian army officer
Michelle Brogan, an Australian basketball player
Mike Brogan, an author's pseudonym
Nicola Brogan, Northern Irish politician
Stephen Brogan, an English footballer
William Brogan, Australian rugby player

References 

Surnames of British Isles origin
Anglicised Irish-language surnames